Excoecaria antsingyensis is a species of flowering plant in the family Euphorbiaceae. It was described in 1939. It is native to Madagascar.

References

antsingyensis
Plants described in 1939
Endemic flora of Madagascar